Hypership Out of Control is an iOS game developed by American studio Fun Infused Games and released on September 15, 2011. A sequel was released on January 20, 2014 entitled Hypership Still Out of Control. The game was released on Steam on 29 September 2015.

Critical reception
The game has a Metacritic score of 85% based on 6 critic reviews.

Hypership Still Out of Control
Pocket Gamer UK gave the game 80%, writing "An engaging and easy-to-play arcade burst with a hard and challenging core, Hypership Still Out of Control doesn't do enough to differentiate itself from its predecessor." 148Apps gave the game 70%, commenting " This remix of fast-paced shoot 'em up Hypership Out of Control should satisfy new players, but those expecting a true sequel will be let down."

References

2011 video games
IOS games
Shoot 'em ups
Video games developed in the United States
Windows games